Nemotelus sordidus is a species of soldier fly in the family Stratiomyidae.

Distribution
Peru.

References

Stratiomyidae
Insects described in 1914
Diptera of South America
Endemic fauna of Peru
Taxa named by Kálmán Kertész